Minuscule 578 (in the Gregory-Aland numbering), ε 453 (in the Soden numbering), is a Greek minuscule manuscript of the New Testament, on paper. It is dated by a colophon to the year 1361.
The manuscript has complex contents.

Description 

The codex contains the text of the four Gospels on 241 paper leaves (size ). The writing is in one column per page, 25-26 lines per page.

Text 

The Greek text of the codex is a representative of the Byzantine text-type. According to Hermann von Soden it is close to the textual groups 1216 and 16. Aland placed it in Category V.
According to the Claremont Profile Method it belongs to the group 16 Luke 1 and Luke 10, but in Luke 20 to the group 1167. It is creates textual pair with the codex 217 in Luke 1 and Luke 10.

The Pericope Adulterae (John 7:53-8:11) was omitted by the first scribe, and in the 16th century a later hand added the leaves with the text of pericope.

History 

The manuscript was written by Johannes, a scribe.

Scrivener labelled it by 872. Gregory saw the manuscript in 1884.

Currently the manuscript is housed at the library of the Bibliothèque municipale (Sect. Med., H. 446) in Arras.

See also 

 List of New Testament minuscules
 Biblical manuscript
 Textual criticism

References

Further reading 

 

Greek New Testament minuscules
14th-century biblical manuscripts